François Kompany (born 28 September 1989) is a Belgian footballer who last played for Patro Eisden in the Belgian First Amateur Division as a left-back.

Career
On 8 March 2020, Kompany joined Patro Eisden.

Personal life
François is the brother of professional footballer Vincent Kompany. François is of Congolese descent through his father.

References

External links

1989 births
Living people
Association football fullbacks
Belgian footballers
Belgian expatriate footballers
Belgian sportspeople of Democratic Republic of the Congo descent
K.S.V. Roeselare players
Macclesfield Town F.C. players
R.W.D.M. Brussels F.C. players
S.C. Eendracht Aalst players
Sportkring Sint-Niklaas players
K. Patro Eisden Maasmechelen players
Challenger Pro League players
Belgian expatriate sportspeople in England
Expatriate footballers in England

People from Uccle
Footballers from Brussels